Matthew "Matt" Archibald (born 20 May 1986) is a New Zealand racing cyclist.

He won the bronze medal in the Men's 1 km time trial at the 2014 Commonwealth Games. He won the bronze medal in the same event at the 2015 UCI Track Cycling World Championships.

References

1986 births
New Zealand male cyclists
Cyclists at the 2014 Commonwealth Games
Commonwealth Games bronze medallists for New Zealand
Living people
Commonwealth Games medallists in cycling
21st-century New Zealand people
Medallists at the 2014 Commonwealth Games